The 1971 Grantland Rice Bowl was an NCAA College Division game following the 1971 season, between the Tennessee State Tigers and the McNeese State Cowboys.

Notable participants
From Tennessee State, three players were selected in the 1972 NFL Draft – defensive back Clifford Brooks, linebacker Robert Stevenson, and quarterback Joe Gilliam. Players later selected in the 1973 NFL Draft include tackle Robert Woods, tight end Jim Thaxton, wide receiver Ollie Smith, defensive end Will Wynn, and wide receiver Charlie Wade. Sophomore defensive end Ed "Too Tall" Jones would be the number one pick in the 1974 NFL Draft.

From McNeese State, guard Mike O'Quinn was selected in the 1972 NFL Draft. Running back Larry Grissom was inducted to his university's hall of fame in 1985, as was safety Billy Blakeman in 2009. Quarterback Greg Davis went on to be the head coach at Tulane, and offensive coordinator for several college teams.

Tennessee State head coach John Merritt was inducted to the College Football Hall of Fame in 1994.  McNeese State head coach Jack Doland was inducted to the Louisiana Sports Hall of Fame in 2002.

Scoring summary

Grissom's field goal was the first in Grantland Rice Bowl history.

References

Grantland Rice Bowl
Grantland Rice Bowl
McNeese Cowboys football bowl games
Tennessee State Tigers football bowl games
December 1971 sports events in the United States
Grantland Rice